The 2016 World Snowshoe Championships was the 9th edition of the global snowshoe running competition, World Snowshoe Championships, organised by the World Snowshoe Federation and took place in Vezza d'Oglio from 5 to 6 February 2016.

Results
The race, held on the distance of 9.5 km, has compiled two different ranking (male and female) overall, it was the mass start system and more than 100 competitors participated.

Male Overall

Female Overall

References

External links
 World Snowshoe Federation official web site

World Snowshoe Championships